Parsons Corporation (Parsons) is an American technology-focused defense, intelligence, security, and infrastructure engineering firm headquartered in Centreville, Virginia. The company was founded in 1944.

Parsons has more than 16,000 employees across 24 countries.  Carey Smith serves as Chairwoman, President, and CEO of Parsons.

History

Parsons was founded by Ralph M. Parsons in 1944. The company delivered electronics, instrumentation, ground checkout systems design, and engineering for aircraft, missiles and rockets during the Cold War. In 1974, Parsons opened the first part of its headquarters in Pasadena.

In 2004, a $29.5 million contract was given to both Parsons and Gilbert Southern/Massman Construction to redo a portion of the Escambia Bay Bridge near Pensacola, FL after Hurricane Ivan made landfall and knocked off 58 spans of the original bridge and misaligned 66 other spans. Traffic destined for the bridge was rerouted onto US 90 (exit 17 on I-10) for 2 months while construction was taking place, which caused severe traffic jams. The westbound bridge opened to traffic on October 4, six days ahead of schedule, while the eastbound lanes opened to traffic on November 20, 66 days after Ivan made landfall and 27 days ahead of schedule. Both contractors received $1.5 million in bonuses for the early completion.

In 2006, Parsons acquired the Houston-based design and construction company 3D/International.

In late February 2019, Parsons announced the move of its headquarters from Pasadena, California to Centreville, Virginia.

On May 8, 2019, Parsons executed an Initial Public Offering of approximately $500 million on the New York Stock Exchange under the symbol PSN.

In December 2019, it was announced that Parsons and Leidos Holdings Inc. had earned spots on a $4 billion contract to support the cleanup of a former nuclear weapons site in southern Washington state.

Founder's legacy
In 1961, Parsons founded the Ralph M. Parsons Foundation. The foundation became entirely independent from the company in 1974.

Signature projects
Notable Parsons projects include:

 Titan and Minuteman ICBM bases, sites and silos (along with another California-based contractor—Daniel, Mann, Johnson & Mendenhall)
 Pershing MRBM miss-distance indicators
 Tacoma Narrows Bridge (1950)
 Olivier-Charbonneau Bridge (A25)
 Mackinac Bridge
 25 de Abril Bridge
 Work on Brooklyn Bridge and Williamsburg Bridge

Acquisitions

References

External links
 "Crucial Iraq police academy 'a disaster'", The Seattle Times, September 28, 2006

Companies based in Fairfax County, Virginia
Construction and civil engineering companies established in 1944
Construction and civil engineering companies of the United States
Defense companies of the United States
Engineering companies of the United States
1944 establishments in California
American companies established in 1944
2019 initial public offerings
Companies listed on the New York Stock Exchange
Strait of Messina Bridge